Jon Blake may refer to:

Jon Blake (actor) (1958–2011), Australian actor
Jon Blake (author) (born 1954), British author
Jon Blake (broadcaster), Australian broadcaster
Jon Blake, a character in The Wicked + The Divine

See also
 John Blake (disambiguation)